This is a list of Portuguese television related events from 2005.

Events
14 January - Sérgio Lucas wins the second series of Ídolos.

Debuts

Television shows

Ending this year
Ídolos (2003-2005, 2009–present)
Operação triunfo (2003-2011)

Births

Deaths